Aktyube is a rural locality (a selo) in Aktyubinsky Selsoviet of Volodarsky District, Astrakhan Oblast, Russia. The population was 92 as of 2010. There are 7 streets.

Geography 
It is located on the Kushumbet River, 9 km west of Volodarsky (the district's administrative centre) by road. Kostyube is the nearest rural locality.

References 

Rural localities in Volodarsky District, Astrakhan Oblast